Smoky Ordinary is an unincorporated area in Brunswick County, Virginia.
Location: 36° 49.729′ N, 77° 44.283′ W. Marker is near Dolphin, Virginia, in Brunswick County. Marker is at the intersection of Liberty Road and Old Stage Road, on the left when traveling east on Liberty Road

The ordinary that stood on this site catered to travelers on the north-south stage road as early as 1750. During the American Revolution local warehouses were burned by British Colonel Tarleton, and legend says that it was from that occurrence that the ordinary derived its name. During the Civil War the post office (1832-1964) and inn were spared when a Union officer recognized the inn's owner, Dr. George M. Raney, as being a former classmate at the University of Pennsylvania.

History
"Ordinary" is sometimes referred to a tavern or a place where food is sold to the public The name of this location was sometimes spelled as "Smokey Ordinary". A post office called Smokey Ordinary was established in 1832, and remained in operation until 1964. The town's first name was "Ordinary", but after it burned during the Revolutionary War, the name was prefixed with "Smok(e)y".

References

Unincorporated communities in Brunswick County, Virginia
Unincorporated communities in Virginia